Perbing is a village near Namchi in the South Sikkim district of Sikkim state, India some  from the state capital Gangtok. The village is demographically dominated by the Sherpa tribe of Sikkim.

The village comes under the 14 Perbing-Dovan gram panchayat unit (local administrative unit) and is under the 13 Namthang-Rateypani Constituency.

References

Villages in Namchi district